Shelford may refer to:

Places
 Shelford, Nottinghamshire, village in Nottinghamshire, England
 Shelford, Victoria, Australia
 Shelford, Warwickshire, location in England
 Great Shelford, village in Cambridgeshire, England
 Little Shelford, village in Cambridgeshire, England
 Shelford Priory, priory in Nottinghamshire, England
 Shelford railway station, in Cambridgeshire, England
 Shelford Girls' Grammar, a private school for girls in Caulfield, Victoria, Australia 

Sports teams
 Shelford Rugby Club, rugby union side based in Great Shelford, Cambridgeshire

Given names
 Shelford Bidwell (1848–1909), English physicist and inventor

Family names:
 Adrian Shelford, New Zealand rugby league footballer
 Angus Shelford (b. 1976), New Zealand boxer
 Buck Shelford (b. 1957), New Zealand rugby player
 Kelly Shelford, New Zealand rugby league footballer
 Robert Walter Campbell Shelford (1872–1912), British entomologist, museum administrator, and naturalist
 Victor Ernest Shelford (1877–1968), American zoologist

See also 
Scalford
Shalford (disambiguation)